Edwin Keeble may refer to:

Edwin Augustus Keeble (1807–1868), American politician 
Edwin A. Keeble (1905–1979), American architect